Sgurr Mhurlagain (880 m) is a mountain in the Northwest Highlands, Scotland, west of the village of Spean Bridge in Lochaber.

A large and bulky peak, it forms much of the southern wall of Glen Kingie, whereas Loch Arkaig lies to its south. Three ridges descend from its summit to the northeast.

References

Mountains and hills of the Northwest Highlands
Marilyns of Scotland
Corbetts